61 Squadron or 61st Squadron may refer to:

 No. 61 Squadron RAF, a unit of the United Kingdom Royal Air Force 
 61st Fighter Squadron, a soon to be activated unit of the United States Air Force 
 61st Bombardment Squadron, a unit of the United States Air Force 
 61st Airlift Squadron, a unit of the United States Air Force

See also
 61st Division (disambiguation)